The team eventing at the 1928 Summer Olympics (referred to at the time as the "competition for the equestrian championship") took place at Hilversum.  The event consisted of a dressage competition, a jumping competition, and an endurance test.  Scores in each component were added to give a total. Scores from the individual competition were summed to give results in the team competition.

Pairs that did not finish scored zero for their teams.  Only three teams had all three of their pairs finish, with each of those teams winning medals.  The fourth to ninth places went to teams that had two finishers, and tenth to thirteenth places went to teams with just one finisher.  Bulgaria was credited with fourteenth place, though none of its pairs finished.

Results
Source: Official results; De Wael

References

Equestrian at the 1928 Summer Olympics